Events in the year 2007 in Gabon.

Incumbents 

 President: Omar Bongo Ondimba
 Prime Minister: Jean Eyeghé Ndong

Events 

 July – The Union for the New Republic was founded by Louis-Gaston Mayila.

Deaths

References 

 
2000s in Gabon
Years of the 21st century in Gabon
Gabon